Acratini is a tribe of primitive weevils in the family of beetles known as Brentidae. There are about 12 genera and at least 110 described species in Acratini.

Genera
These 12 genera belong to the tribe Acratini:

 Acratus Lacordaire, 1865 i c g
 Fonteboanius Senna, 1893 i c g
 Leptocymatium Kleine, 1922 i c g
 Neacratus Alonso-Zarazaga, Lyal, Bartolozzi and Sforzi, 1999 i c g
 Nemobrenthus Sharp, 1895 i c g
 Nemocephalinus Kleine, 1927 i c g
 Nemocephalus Guérin-Méneville, 1827 i c g
 Nemocoryna Sharp, 1895 i c g
 Proteramocerus Kleine, 1921 i c g
 Sclerotrachelus Kleine, 1921 i c g
 Teramocerus Schoenherr, 1840 i c g
 Thaumastopsis Kleine, 1921 i c g

Data sources: i = ITIS, c = Catalogue of Life, g = GBIF, b = Bugguide.net

References

Further reading

 
 
 
 
 
 
 
 
 
 
 
 
 

Brentidae